The Zumurrud Khatun Mosque and Mausoleum, also known as the Tomb of Sitta Zubayda, is a historic mosque and shrine located in Baghdad, Iraq. It dates back to the Abbasid era. It is located in Sheikh Maarouf Cemetery in the Karkh side of Baghdad, and the site was built at the patronage of Zumurrud Khatun and her son. Zumurrud Khatun was mother of the 34th Abbasid Caliph Al-Nasir, and wife of the 33rd Abbasid Caliph Al-Mustadi. She collected the waqf money from madrasas and built her mausoleum before her death, which is located in Karkh.

The building is covered by the distinct nine layered muqarnas dome capped by a small cupola. The minaret of the mosque is considered built during the time of Seljuq dynasty in 12th century, and it is considered the oldest surviving minaret in Baghdad. The building has robust construction made of bricks and plaster. There is also an attached library, and an adjoined Shafi'i madrasa. Due to the mosque being dominated by Hanafi maddhab, the extension to the north for Shafi'i maddhab was added, which is called Shafi'i Mosque.

The mosque is one of two historic mausoleums in Karkh. The other is the Sheikh Maruf Mosque.

History 
By most accounts, Zumurrud Khatun is identified as a formerly-enslaved Turkish woman who became a prominent noblewoman during the Abbasid Caliphate. She rose to this position through multiple marriages, but most notable is her marriage to the Caliph Al-Mustadi. Zumurrud Khatun is also remembered as the mother of Abbasid Caliph Al-Nasir. She is described as being a religious woman and an active patroness of architecture and public works. Her legacy as patroness was due to her restoration of public infrastructure and for building educational and funerary buildings. The Mosque and Mausoleum of Zumurrud Khatun were created at the commission of Al-Nasir and his mother before her death in 1202. After her death, she was laid to rest in the mausoleum following a funeral procession.

Zamurrud Khatun was also actively involved in the construction of a madrasa. Furthermore, she was also remembered by many as an active member in politics and Islamic religious policies, a generous person devoted to Islamic teachings and law, and various other aspects. For instance, she is in history for spending 300,000 dirhams to repair water supplies and cisterns during the pilgrimage.

Architecture

The Building’s Plan and Space 
The building features a nine-layered conically-shaped muqarnas roof topped off with a cupola. The inside room of the structure is about 3 meters long and about 7 meters wide. Beyond the entrance is a narrow staircase that leads to the grave room at the base of the minaret. The roofing system of the mausoleum originated in a period in Islamic art in the 11th and 12th centuries. Sources state that this type of mosque and mausoleum might have originated in Iraq although there are similar structures in locations around regions of Iran.

The Dome 

The Mausoleum’s dome is made out of muqarnas, (also known as stalactite or honeycomb vaulting) one of the most original inventions of Islamic architecture which can appear in a variety of materials such as; stucco, brick, stone, and wood. Muqarnas can be applied in multiple architectural forms including; cornices, corbelled transitions, capitals, vaults, and domes, as with the Zumurrud Khatun Mosque. Brick vaults and domes have been known in the Near East since Sassanian times, if not before, but the dome in muqarnas is a truly Islamic creation without precedent in any civilization. According to Yasser Tabba author of, "Muqarnas Vaulting and Ash’ari Occasionalism”, describes Zumurrud Khatun’s shrine to be the “most graceful profile and one of the most integrated interiors of all conical muqarnas domes." Not only does the dome consist of an octagonal base it also includes geometric decorations that support the conical brick vault. In which the Muqarnas display their exterior articulations of the muqarnas on the outside instead of its interior which makes the illusion of the dome to appear as pinecone.

The Structure

The mausoleum of Zamurrud Khatum is designed as a monumental and unique Islamic structure similar to Islamic architecture of the time. It is developed with integrated layers that make its structure artistic. Its base is octagonal, a transition that has informed the construction of modern structures such as the Pentagon in the United States. On top of its octagonal base, the mausoleum gradually and unobtrusively transitions into a dome of sixteen cells pegged on muqarnas squinches that keeps the base and the upper part in sync. Seven tiers occupy most of the sixteen cells, stucco-layered against the remaining tiers. Each of the cells embodies a tiny opening covered by thick glass, giving the viewer an obscured view.

Controversies

Identification Controversy 
According to Vincenzo Strika, The Mosque and Mausoleum of Zumurrud Khatun have been repeatedly misidentified by scholars. Most commonly, the mosque and mausoleum are quoted as being created by Sitta Zubayda rather than Zumurrud Khatun herself. The history of this misunderstanding has been explored by Vincenzo Strika, who believes it was created by earlier scholars but was first challenged by Guy Le Strange and later solved by Mustafa Jawād. As Strika highlights, “The first to hint that the Tomb was not that of Zubaydah was, Le Strange..'', referencing Le Strange’s finding that Sitta Zubayda was buried elsewhere. Confusion as to the identities of Sitta Zubayda and Zumurrud Khatun has also been a catalyst for some of this misidentification. In the past, researchers have considered if the two women were, in reality, a single person who had been confused as being two separate people, but since it has been determined that Sitta Zubayda was, in fact, a different noblewoman.

Architectural Controversy

The mausoleum of Zumurrud Khatun has been tracked into controversies, especially regarding the originality of its architectural design. Many argue that the mausoleum's designs were borrowed from other shrines built in Baghdad, Tigris, and other parts of Iraq. For instance, it has been argued that the mausoleum of Zamurrud Khatun's architectural design was borrowed from the shrine of al-Najmi and the mausoleum of Nur al-Din constructed earlier than the mausoleum of Zamurrud Khatun. However, the exact dates upon which these monuments were constructed are unclear.

Gallery

See also

 Islam in Iraq
 List of mosques in Iraq
 Al-Sarai Mosque

References

13th-century mosques
Mosques in Baghdad
Mausoleums in Iraq
Seljuk architecture